Dreamscape Entertainment is a Philippine television production company and entertainment division of ABS-CBN Corporation. It is one of the media conglomerate's television production units that supplies telenovelas for the flagship television network ABS-CBN and its sister channels and online platforms.

While the main ABS-CBN network is currently off the air due to the expired broadcast franchise, Dreamscape Entertainment produces telenovelas on Kapamilya Channel (main ad interim replacement network), Kapamilya Online Live (web-based channel), TV5 (blocktime agreement with MediaQuest Holdings), A2Z (blocktime agreement with ZOE Broadcasting Network, Inc.), iWantTFC and TFC (Streaming platform and international channel), as well as other cable channels including Jeepney TV and Cine Mo! distributed by ABS-CBN Entertainment. While it started producing television dramas in 1992, Dreamscape only began to identify themselves in January 2013 to distinguish from Star Creatives (a division of Star Creatives Group, which also managed Star Cinema), another drama production unit of ABS-CBN founded in 2000.

List of television dramas produced by Dreamscape

1990s

2000s

2010s

2020s

Gallery

Upcoming dramas
 Linlang

References

External links

ABS-CBN
ABS-CBN Corporation
ABS-CBN subsidiaries

Television production companies of the Philippines
Companies based in Quezon City
Mass media companies established in 1992
1992 establishments in the Philippines